Charles Hull VC (24 July 1890 – 13 February 1953) was an English recipient of the Victoria Cross, the highest and most prestigious award for gallantry in the face of the enemy that can be awarded to British and Commonwealth forces during the First World War.

Details
Hull worked as a postman in Harrogate before he enlisted in the 21st Lancers (Empress of India's), a cavalry regiment of the British Army, where was a shoeing-smith making and fitting horseshoes.

On 5 September 1915 Hull was a 25-years-old private when he rescued an officer from certain death at the hands of tribesmen at Hafiz Kor on the North West Frontier of British India, an action for which he was awarded the VC. The citation was published in the London Gazette on 3 March 1916 and read:

He later achieved the rank of corporal. After the war he joined Leeds Constabulary and rose to the rank of sergeant.  Hull is buried in Woodhouse Cemetery, Leeds.

The Medal
His VC is on display in The Royal Lancers and Nottinghamshire Yeomanry Museum in Thoresby Hall, Nottinghamshire.

References

External links
 Harrogate People
 British Legion
Location of grave and VC medal (West Yorkshire)

1890 births
1953 deaths
Military personnel from Yorkshire
People from Harrogate
British World War I recipients of the Victoria Cross
21st Lancers soldiers
British Army personnel of World War I
Recipients of the Croix de Guerre 1914–1918 (France)
British police officers
British Army recipients of the Victoria Cross